SoundsXP is a UK based music webzine.  It was set up in 2001 by Paul Mawdesley, Ged McAlea and Kevin Odell and is entirely based on contributions from unpaid writers.  The site mostly publishes reviews and interviews covering primarily the indie, indiepop, shoegaze, folk, alt-country and electronica musical genres. It also covers alternative music news and free MP3 downloads. The front page includes a regularly updated music player which showcases current songs recommended by the writers. In addition, SoundsXP has forums to allow for discussion and comments on the articles, as well as live event notices which are free to use for bands and promoters for publicity.  The site has organised a number of live events over the years featuring artists such as the Broken Family Band, the Bishops, Younghusband, Pete and the Pirates and many more.

Record Label

In 2006  the webzine set up a label, Sounds eXPerience, with limited 7" releases by Piney Gir's Country Roadshow, the Schla La Las, the Bridge Gang,  Santa Dog and a split release by Esiotrot and Foxes!.

References

External links 
Official site

Online music magazines published in the United Kingdom